Ms. Justice Sanju Panda (born 10 July 1959) is an Indian judge. She is a former Judge of Orissa High Court. She has also served as Acting Chief Justice of Orissa High Court.

Career 
She was born on 10 July 1959 at Paralakhemundi in Odisha. She was enrolled in the Bar in 1985. She was elevated as Judge of Orissa High Court on 1 March 2007. She was appointed Acting Chief Justice of Orissa High Court on 5 January 2020 after retirement of Chief Justice Kalpesh Satyendra Jhaveri till 24 April 2020. She retired on 9 July 2021.

References

1959 births
Living people
Indian judges
20th-century Indian women lawyers
20th-century Indian lawyers
Judges of the Orissa High Court